News Parade is a 1928 American comedy film directed by David Butler and starring Nick Stuart, Sally Phipps and Brandon Hurst. The film portrays the adventures of a newsreel cameraman. Despite poor reviews and only a modest box office performance it was followed by several similar films including Chasing Through Europe (1929).

Cast
 Nick Stuart as 'Newsreel Nick' Naylor  
 Sally Phipps as Sally Wellington  
 Brandon Hurst as A.K. Wellington  
 Cyril Ring as Prince Oscar  
 Earle Foxe as Ivan Vodkoff - Mysterious Stranger  
 Franklin Underwood as Bill Walpole  
 Truman H. Talley as Direct-in-Chief Talley

References

Bibliography
 Solomon, Aubrey. The Fox Film Corporation, 1915-1935. A History and Filmography. McFarland & Co, 2011.

External links

1928 films
1928 comedy films
Silent American comedy films
Films directed by David Butler
American silent feature films
1920s English-language films
American black-and-white films
Fox Film films
1920s American films